Narka is a former settlement in Inyo County, California. Narka, also known as siding 20, was created in February 1909 to support construction of the Los Angeles Aqueduct camp at Soda Hill. Narka began as a railroad camp before Little Lake was settled. A post office operated at Narka from 1909 to 1913, when the service was transferred to Little Lake. Narka was abandoned on March 15, 1935.

References

Former settlements in Inyo County, California
Former populated places in California